Han Fangteng (Chinese: 韩方腾; born 22 March 1985) is a retired Chinese football player.

Club career
In 2006, Han Fangteng started his professional footballer career with Shanghai United in the Chinese Super League. He would eventually make his league debut for Shanghai on 15 October 2006 in a game against Shenyang Ginde that ended in a 3-1 victory. The following season saw Shanghai United merged with fellow top tier club Shanghai Shenhua, leading to a significantly larger squad.

In March 2007, he was loaned out to China League Two side Suzhou Trips until 31 December. On his return to Shanghai he did not make any appearances and on March 2009, he was loaned out to China League Two side Qingdao QUST until 31 December. Once again on March 2010, he was loaned out to another China League Two side Harbin Yiteng until 31 December.

In March 2011, Han transferred to China League Two side Harbin Yiteng. In the 2011 China League Two campaign he would be part of the team that won the division and promotion into the second tier. He would go on to be a member of the squad as they moved up divisions and gained promotion to the Chinese Super League.

In January 2015, Han transferred to China League One side Nei Mongol Zhongyou. He would remain with them for several seasons until the end of the 2019 campaign when he retired.

Career statistics 
Statistics accurate as of match played 31 December 2019.

Honours

Club
Harbin Yiteng
 China League Two: 2011

References

External links
 

1985 births
Living people
Chinese footballers
Footballers from Dalian
Shanghai Shenhua F.C. players
Zhejiang Yiteng F.C. players
Inner Mongolia Zhongyou F.C. players
Chinese Super League players
China League One players
China League Two players
Association football goalkeepers
21st-century Chinese people